Three referendums were held simultaneously in Ireland on 7 June 2001, each on a proposed amendment of the Constitution of Ireland. Two of the measures were approved, while the third was rejected. The two successful amendments concerned the death penalty and the International Criminal Court.

The failed amendment concerned the Treaty of Nice. It has also been intended to submit a fourth proposal to a referendum, concerning the investigation of judges, but this amendment was not ultimately passed by the Oireachtas (parliament) and so was never put to a vote.

Twenty-first Amendment

The Twenty-first Amendment introduced a constitutional ban on the death penalty and removed all references to capital punishment from the text. The proposal was approved.

Twenty-second Amendment

The Twenty-second Amendment Bill proposed to establish a body for the investigation of judges and to amend the procedure for the removal of judges. It was not passed by the houses of the Oireachtas and therefore was not submitted to a referendum. It is a "missing amendment" of the Constitution of Ireland.

Twenty-third Amendment

The Twenty-third Amendment permitted the state to ratify the Rome Statute of the International Criminal Court. The proposal was approved.

Twenty-fourth Amendment

The Twenty-fourth Amendment Bill proposed that the state ratify the Nice Treaty of the European Union. The proposal was rejected.

See also
Constitutional amendment
Politics of the Republic of Ireland
History of the Republic of Ireland

References

2001 in international relations
2001 in Irish law
2001 in the European Union
2001 referendums
Ireland 2001
Anti–death penalty laws
June 2001 events in Europe
Constitutional 2001